A storyboard is a layout for planning video action.

Storyboard or Storyboards may also refer to:
 Storyboard (TV series), a television show (1961)
 Storyboards (album), a musical recording
 IBM Storyboard Plus, a graphic software suite
 Storyboard (Apple programming), a file format used in software development for iOS and macOS computers

See also